Mario Ebenhofer (born 29 July 1992) is an Austrian footballer who plays as a midfielder for SGV Freiberg.

References

External links

 
 

1992 births
Living people
Austrian footballers
Association football midfielders
Austrian Football Bundesliga players
2. Liga (Austria) players
Austrian Regionalliga players
SKU Amstetten players
SC Wiener Neustadt players
SKN St. Pölten players
FC Blau-Weiß Linz players
Liga I players
FC Botoșani players
Austrian expatriate sportspeople in Romania
Expatriate footballers in Romania